Akademik may refer to:

 Akademiks, a US clothing brand
 Akademik Stadium, a Bulgarian football stadium
 PFC Akademik Sofia, a Bulgarian football club
 Akademik Svishtov, a Bulgarian football club
 Akademik, a transliterated Soviet title for academicians
 Akademik Lomonosov, nuclear barge
 Akademik Shokalskiy, research ship
 Akademik Ioffe, research ship
 Akademik Fedorov, flagship research ship

See also 
 Academy